RPET may be an acronym for:

 Rajasthan Pre-Engineering Test
 Recycled polyethylene terephthalate; see PET bottle recycling